The 2003 Vanderbilt Commodores football team represented the Vanderbilt University in the 2003 NCAA Division I-A football season.  Led by head coach Bobby Johnson in his second year as the head coach, the Commodores finished with a record of 2–10 for the second straight season and 21st consecutive losing season. Ended a 23 consecutive losing streak to SEC teams with a win to Kentucky.

Schedule

Roster

Team players drafted into the NFL
No players from the 2003 Vanderbilt team were drafted.

References

Vanderbilt
Vanderbilt Commodores football seasons
Vanderbilt Commodores football